Jorge Alberto Páez Santamaría (born 19 August 1995) is a Venezuelan professional footballer who plays as an attacking midfielder.

Club career
Páez started his career with local side Academia Emeritense, before moving to Venezuelan Primera División's Zamora in 2013. In 2015, Páez moved to the United States to play college soccer at Monroe College, where he went on to play two seasons, making 31 appearances, scoring 18 goals and tallying five assists.

Páez returned to Zamora, before spells at LALA FC and  Portuguesa. On 12 January 2022, he was back in the United States, signing with USL League One club Chattanooga Red Wolves.

References

1995 births
Living people
Venezuelan footballers
Association football midfielders
Portuguesa F.C. players
Chattanooga Red Wolves SC players
Venezuelan Primera División players
Venezuelan Segunda División players
USL League One players
Venezuelan expatriate footballers
Venezuelan expatriate sportspeople in the United States
Expatriate soccer players in the United States
People from Mérida, Mérida